Hoang Mai can refer to:
 Hoàng Mai District of Hanoi
 Hoàng Mai, Nghệ An, a town in Quỳnh Lưu District, Nghệ An Province
 Hoang Mai (politician), a politician in Quebec.